The VT 125 is a former diesel multiple unit commissioned by the Deutsche Bundesbahn from 1953 onwards. It was commonly used with either two or three car configurations, using the VM 12 middle car and VS 12 driving van trailer. Three-car trains were usually made up of two motor units and one unpowered middle car. The trainsets were routinely made up from twelve driving cars, four control cars and 13 middle cars and used in city express services. The VT 125 was used in regional traffic, with first and second class saloon seating.

History 
With the experience gained from the VT 92 test car, the VT 125 was conceived for regional services and worked these until 1984. Four sets of a motor unit, centre coach and control coach were supplied in 1953 as VT/VM/VS 12 501–504. In 1957 eight motor units, VT 12 505–512, and nine centre coaches, VM 12 505–513 were added. Five superfluous VS 08.5 units were converted into control cars in about 1957 and designated VS 12 505–509. This second delivery was also aimed at train ferry services to Denmark. Until 1971 the long distance variant, VT 085 was adapted to the VT 125 and, after its conversion, designated as the VT 126. From 1968 the VT 125 bore the EDV class number 612, the VT 126 was redesignated as the Class 613. After initially operating from Cologne and Dortmund the DMUs were based for many years at the Hamburg-Altona railway depot and, from 1982, stationed at the Brunswick depot.

Technology 
The VT 125 was derived from the express DMU, the VT 085. Externally it differed from the VT 085 only in that it had centre doors and wider end doors. On delivery the four first trainsets also differed in also having 3rd class accommodation; this was changed to 2nd class accommodation after the 1956 class reform. Another difference was to do with the heating system: the VT 125 had central, oil-fired, hot water heating for up to three coaches which was housed in the power car, while the VT 08 had independent oil-fired heating in each coach. This restricted the ability to freely combine it with the VT 08.5.

The driving car had a cab which was somewhat larger than that of the VT 08.5, but, like the latter, had a luggage and postal section. In addition, there was an open compartment with 44 seats and aisle 2+2 for the 3rd class (2nd class) and a depth of 1600 mm. In the centre coach there was a similar open compartment in one half; and in the other half a 3rd class open compartment with 28 seat plus, towards the end, a 2nd class open compartment with 20 seats and 2,000 mm depth. In the driving car there was a 2nd class open compartment with 20 seats and a 3rd class open with 16 seats at one end and, towards the driving cab, two 3rd class opens with 24 and 16 seats respectively.

Surviving examples 
In 1988 the DB leisure group BSW-Gruppe VT612 Stuttgarter Rössle took over diesel power car 612 506/507 with centre cars 912 501 and 507 for a museum project (driving car  912 601 was used for spares). After successful restoration the driving car was christened in honour of the heraldic stallion on Stuttgart's coat of arms by the Lord Mayor of the city,  Manfred Rommel, and given the name Stuttgarter Rössle ("Little Stuttgart Stallion"). In 2006 the Stuttgarter Rössle was taken over by the DB ZugBus Regionalverkehr Alb-Bodensee (RAB), a sister company of Deutsche Bahn. It has since been used for heritage trips. In 2008 it was stored for renovations.
On 2 December 2013, the driving car was reassembled. A problem in the power train of the driving bogie of the TK 507 prevented the brakes being replaced in 2014 in by the RAB at the Ulm Depot. On 22 August 2015 the Stuttgarter Rössle was transferred to Ulm by locomotive no. 218 410. It is currently being worked on at the Fahrzeugwerk Miraustraße (FWM) near Berlin.

References 

Diesel multiple units of Germany